Cycnium is a genus of flowering plant in the family Orobanchaceae. Its native range is tropical and southern Africa and Madagascar.

Species
, Plants of the World Online accepted the following species:

Cycnium adonense E.Mey. ex Benth.
Cycnium ajugifolium Engl.
Cycnium angolense (Engl.) O.J.Hansen
Cycnium breviflorum Ghaz.
Cycnium cameronianum (Oliv.) Engl.
Cycnium chevalieri Diels
Cycnium erectum Rendle
Cycnium filicalyx (E.A.Bruce) O.J.Hansen
Cycnium herzfeldianum (Vatke) Engl.
Cycnium jamesii (Skan) O.J.Hansen
Cycnium petunioides Hutch.
Cycnium racemosum Benth.
Cycnium recurvum (Oliv.) Engl.
Cycnium tenuisectum (Standl.) O.J.Hansen
Cycnium tubulosum (L.f.) Engl.
Cycnium veronicifolium (Vatke) Engl.
Cycnium volkensii Engl.

References

Cycnium
Flora of Africa
Orobanchaceae genera